The Druzhina is a river in Yakutia in Russia, a left tributary of the Indigirka.

Course
It has its source at the Ulakhan-Koyol Lake. The river flows eastwards, meandering across a lake-dotted area of the Aby Lowland.

The Druzhina freezes up in October and remains icebound until late May or early June.

See also
Druzhina, Sakha Republic

References

Rivers of the Sakha Republic